WBNH (88.5 FM) is a Christian radio station with a license for Pekin, Illinois. WBNH is a primary affiliate of the Moody Broadcasting Network and broadcasts Christian music and talk and programs.  It is owned by the Central Illinois Radio Fellowship, and its studio is in Pekin.

Translators
In addition to the main station, WBNH is relayed by an additional translator to widen its broadcast area.

References

External links
 WBNH Radio official website
 
 
 

BNH
BNH
Tazewell County, Illinois
Moody Radio affiliate stations
Radio stations established in 1989
1989 establishments in Illinois